Hwang Hee (born 28 July 1967) is a South Korean politician currently serving as the Minister of Culture, Sports and Tourism under President Moon Jae-in from 2021 and a member of the National Assembly from Yangcheon District of Seoul from 2016.

In January 2021, President Moon Jae-in nominated Hwang as his third Minister of Culture, Sports and Tourism as part of cabinet reshuffle.

He first entered politics in 1997 when he worked as a secretary to then party leader and prominent presidential candidate Kim Dae-jung. From 2003 to 2007 he then worked as an administrator at Office of the President Roh Moo-Hyun from 2003 to 2007.

In 2012 he failed to earn party nomination for the general election. In 2016 Hwang became the first Democratic politician elected to represent Yangcheon A constituency in over two decades.

Hwang holds three degrees: a bachelor's degree in economics from Soongsil University and a master's and a doctorate in urban engineering from Yonsei University.

Electoral history

References 

1967 births
Living people
Minjoo Party of Korea politicians
Soongsil University alumni
Yonsei University alumni
People from Mokpo